Reza Shah issued a royal decree on 15 August 1932 for the ninth parliamentary elections to be held, and the elections started on the following day.
The elections are considered fraudulent and "systematically controlled by the royal court".

References

1932 elections in Asia
Legislative
National Consultative Assembly elections
Electoral fraud in Iran